Abraham Schenck may refer to:

 Abraham Schenck (New York senator), American politician from New York and member of the New York senate
 Abraham H. Schenck (1775–1831), U.S. Representative from New York
 Abraham V. Schenck (1821–1902), State Senator from New Jersey